Macclesfield Forest and Wildboarclough is a civil parish in the unitary authority of Cheshire East and the ceremonial county of  Cheshire, England.  It lies on the western fringe of the Peak District National park. The population of the civil parish taken at the 2011 Census was 189.

The parish is small, so there is no parish council; instead, the residents hold a periodic Parish meeting. The area consists mainly of reservoirs, woodland, farmland, and moorland. There are no centres of population, only a few villages and hamlets, most notably Wildboarclough and Langley.

See also

Listed buildings in Macclesfield Forest and Wildboarclough
Forest Chapel
Macclesfield Forest

Notes and references

Civil parishes in Cheshire
Peak District